Murilo Damasceno Neto (born October 10, 1992 in Mato Grosso, Brazil) is a Brazilian footballer who currently is a Free Agent.

References

External links
Murilo Damasceno at ascensomx.net

Living people
1992 births
Brazilian footballers
Brazilian expatriate footballers
Association football forwards
Cerâmica Atlético Clube players
Ocelotes UNACH footballers
Cafetaleros de Chiapas footballers
Chiapas F.C. footballers
Liga MX players
Ascenso MX players
Liga Premier de México players
Brazilian expatriate sportspeople in Mexico
Expatriate footballers in Mexico
Sportspeople from Mato Grosso